National road 92 (Polish: droga krajowa nr 92) is a route belonging to Polish national roads network, which serves as an alternative route parallel to motorway A2. The road has one lane per direction on the majority of its length. Before the A2 motorway was constructed, it had served as the main connection between Warsaw, Poznań and the Polish-German border as national road 2.

References 

92